Tsim Sha Tsui Fire Station is a fire station in Tsim Sha Tsui, Kowloon, Hong Kong.  The station stands at the Canton Road, adjacent to China Hong Kong City.  The front door of the station was styled with old style fire alarm lights and guarded by a pair of lion statues.  The site was once a Royal Navy torpedo depot.

History
The Tsim Sha Tsui Fire Station replaced the Old Kowloon Fire Station on Salisbury Road, which ceased operating as a fire station in 1971.

See also
 List of fire stations in Hong Kong

References

Buildings and structures completed in 1971
Tsim Sha Tsui
Fire stations in Hong Kong
Government buildings in Hong Kong
1971 establishments in Hong Kong